The dusky-capped woodcreeper (Lepidocolaptes fuscicapillus) or Rondônia woodcreeper, is a species of bird in the Dendrocolaptinae subfamily.  It is found in southwestern Amazonia between the Tapajos and Madeira Rivers. Its natural habitat is subtropical or tropical moist lowland forests.

References

 

dusky-capped woodcreeper
Birds of the Brazilian Amazon
dusky-capped woodcreeper